Sharon Greef is an American politician. She is a Republican representing the 88th district in the Montana House of Representatives.

Political career 
In 2018, Greef's husband and former District 88 representative Edward Greef was unable to run for reelection due to term limits, and she ran for election. She won a three-way Republican primary with 46.5% of the vote, andwon the general election with 63.1% of the vote. She was also reelected in the 2020 election.

As of July 2020, Greef sits on the following committees:
 State Administration
 Transportation
In 2021, she advocated for Republican legislation to end same-day voter registration in Montana for all except military and overseas voters.

Electoral history

2018

2020

Personal life 
Greef and her husband Ed Greef have two children. Their family lives in Florence, Montana.

References 

Republican Party members of the Montana House of Representatives
Women state legislators in Montana
21st-century American politicians
21st-century American women politicians
People from Ravalli County, Montana
Living people
1944 births